Engagio is an American software company based in San Mateo, California marketing a B2B Account Based Marketing platform for account-based initiatives.

History 

Engagio was founded in early 2015 by Jon Miller, co-founder of marketing automation company Marketo, and Brian Babcock. While working as vice president of marketing at Marketo, Miller realized that broad-based demand generation did not work with larger, named accounts. He started developing an account-based strategy, which prompted him to co-found Engagio. The idea to help B2B marketers execute their go-to-market strategy in a sale at the account level prompted him to co-found Engagio. (The company should not be confused with an older software company, also named "Engagio," which was an app for managing social conversations and was acquired by Influitive in 2013.)

Engagio has had two rounds of funding, Series A for $10 million in 2015 and Series B for $22 million in 2016.

As of early 2019, the company operates at over $7M in recurring annual revenue. Several of its customers come from the tech industry, including business software companies like Anaplan, Snowflake Computing, Hortonworks, New Relic, Pendo, and JDA Software.

In 2020, Engagio was acquired by Demandbase. The purchase of Demandbase marks what may be the launch of what critics term a "collision course" between ABM and the platform for marketing automation. Analysts claim it may be profitable if companies with ABM software introduce more marketing automation-like capabilities.

Products 

Engagio offers products for ABM go-to-market strategy: ABM Foundation, Engage Analytics, Engage ABM Automation, Dash Attribution, and Engagio Scout (an extension for Google 's Chrome web browser).
 
ABM Foundation combines data from multiple sources, maps leads to accounts (L2A), and accesses account insights.

Engage Analytics tracks engagement, scores and prioritizes accounts, and measures the impact of ABM programs.

Engage ABM Automation automates multi-channel actions in response to account engagement or inactivity.

Dash Attribution shows Regions Of Interest (ROI) of marketing programs, and is a native Salesforce AppExchange app.
 
Scout Chrome extension accesses account-level and person-level engagement details and manages data.

References

External links 

Companies based in San Mateo, California
Software companies based in California
American companies established in 2015
Software companies of the United States